Manju Borah is a multiple international and national award-winning Indian female film director and short story writer from Guwahati, Assam. Borah also served as Jury Member, Indian Panorama, IFFI 2007, 10th MAMI International Film Festival 2008 and 3rd Eye 7th Asian Film Festival Mumbai 2008, 55th National Film Awards for 2007 (Feature Films) Delhi 2009.

Filmography

Awards 
National Film Awards

Other awards

References

External links
 
 An Interview with Manju Borah at tirbhumi.com.
 Manju Bora’s New Film in Mising

Indian women film directors
Living people
Year of birth missing (living people)
Assamese-language film directors
Writers from Guwahati
Women writers from Assam
Indian women short story writers
20th-century Indian short story writers
21st-century Indian film directors
20th-century Indian film directors
Artists from Guwahati
Film directors from Assam
Special Mention (feature film) National Film Award winners
Directors who won the Best Film on National Integration National Film Award
20th-century women writers
20th-century Indian women